Flavio Armando Córdoba Rodríguez (born 4 October 1984) is a Colombian footballer who currently plays as a defender for La Equidad.

Career
Since 2005 until 2007, Córdoba has played for River, in the Uruguayan First Division. During 2008 he was playing for Cúcuta Deportivo.

In January 2011 he signed for Club Nacional de Football.

In July 2011, Córdoba was loaned to Colombian giants Millonarios FC.

Honours
Nacional
Uruguayan Primera División: 2010-11

Millonarios
Copa Colombia: 2011

References

External links
 
 
 

1984 births
Living people
Colombian footballers
Association football defenders
Huracán Buceo players
Club Atlético River Plate (Montevideo) players
Cúcuta Deportivo footballers
Club Nacional de Football players
Millonarios F.C. players
La Equidad footballers
Categoría Primera A players
Uruguayan Primera División players
Colombian expatriate footballers
Expatriate footballers in Uruguay
Footballers from Bogotá